Friulians, also called Friulans or Furlans are an ethnolinguistic minority living primarily in Italy, with a significant diaspora community.

Friulians primarily inhabit the region of Friuli and speak the Rhaeto-Romantic language Friulian, which is closely related to Ladin, spoken primarily in South Tyrol/Alto Adige, and Romansh, native to the Canton of Grisons in Switzerland.

Distribution
About 600,000 Friulians live in the historical region of Friuli and in parts of Venice. Some other thousands live in diaspora communities mainly in the United States, Canada, Argentina, Brazil, Australia, and Belgium.

They traditionally speak Friulan, a distinct Rhaeto-Romance language which is the second largest recognized minority language in Italy after Sardinian. Genetically, Friulians cluster with broader Europe populations although still show the greatest genetic similarity with the other Italian populations. Friulians have even served during the First World War, notably at the Battle of Vittorio Veneto, where 7,000 Friulians were captured by the Italian Army. Friulians also served in the Second World War, but only a few records remain on the topic.

Friulian population stereotypes
Friulian stereotypes date back to the literature of the 19th century. The ideal characteristics are described in “Il CIANT DE FILOLÒGICHE FURLANE” as "... salt, onest, lavoradôr!”, which refers to the figure of the “good farmer“.

The Agjenzie Regjonâl pe Lenghe Furlane suggests a five-dimensional model to characterise Friulian population:

1. A people of farmers, therefore attached to the land and close to nature; organised in strong family structures and small village communities; hard-working with also good entrepreneurial skills; traditionalist and true to its word;

2. A people of Christians, thus of believers, set within the great catholic tradition, gifted with the virtues of simplicity, humbleness, austerity, ability to withstand the rigors of life with patience and determination.

3. A Nordic population: and therefore strong, serious, slow, taciturn, disciplined, with good organizational skills and sense of community, but with a background of existential sadness that is soothed by hard work but also by wine and expressed by choral singing.

4. A border people: situated in a location exposed to risks, toughened up by a very long history of invasions, plunders and battles; but also with the possibility of opening up and having positive relationships with the neighbouring peoples and other cultures, to mix with them, to welcome them and be welcomed by them;

5. A migrant people: since time immemorial, the imbalance between the population and the resources of the region has forced a number of people to leave their homeland, to seek employment and survival in other countries. Love strengthens in the pain of departure, and an idealised image of one’s own country consolidates in the discomfort of being away from home. Fogolârs are recreated in the arrival communities and the language and traditions are preserved. However, it is worth underlining that this model mostly reflects a historical and social reality that is rather circumscribed: the reality of Friuli between 1870 and 1970.

Main distribution around the world

United States 
In the 1880s a lot of Italians in specific regions of Italy such as Friuli Venezia Giulia started to move around the world with different destinations but one in particular: the United states. They started to move to find jobs or professions. This because of socio-political reasons which were affecting Italy at that time, which hit the Friulan population in particular. 
In the 1880s most emigrants that were reaching United States came from Southern Italy, but many of them actually returned home, because Americans used to import cheap workforce and took the advantage of their knowledge of English.

This situation changed in the last quarter of the 19th century when the US welcomed about 800,000 Italians. Southern Italians Regions and others from the North such as Veneto and Friuli were the most affected by this mass emigration.  

In the US, Italians were excluded from the best-paid jobs. Italians had a bad reputation, due to the stereotypes that were unjustly attached to them. However, this was not the case for the Friulians: they were well-known for their ability of mosaicists. For this reason, they were considered to be highly specialized labourers with no competition.

Canada

Italy experienced a vast migration phenomenon, caused by the political and economical situation of the country. For this reasons, nowadays, there are many first-hand testimonies and characters that speak about this trend, all around the globe.  For example we have different personal memories, literature studies, second-generation writers from Friuli and also Julian-Dalmatian writers that live abroad, especially in Canada. However, these were mainly told orally and only a few of them were written. This makes the reconstruction of the emigration phenomenon a recent fact.

Argentina
After a short period of time, the Friulian immigrants reached the Argentine lands from Brazil. in fact, already during the first post-war Argentina had a higher number of Friulians and Giulians living there.

The first agricultural nucleus populated by a relatively large group of Friulian peasants arose not very distant from Reconquista, in the north of the Province of Santa Fe.

The first ten Friulian families arrived on November 6, 1877. A second contingent of Friulian families arrived in Buenos Aires on January 14, 1878.

Along the 1880s, the number of arrivals slowly lose consistency, and in the first years of the 1900 the phenomenon displayed different characteristics. In this last period, the Friulians preferred the capital, Buenos Aires, while a smaller number of emigrants settled in the other provinces' capitals, such as Córdoba or those in expansion such as Rosario, in the province of Santa Fe.

The end of the First World War once again proposed emigration as one of the most suitable channels to solve the problems that afflicted the Friulian population. After 1919, Argentina, across the ocean, and France, in Europe, welcomed the largest number of Friulians.

There was a new migratory wave in the second post-war, a period that coincided with the Argentine economic boom. From the second half of the 1970s, however, a movement in the opposite direction began, aggravated by the Argentine economic crisis.

Indeed, in the period 1989-1991, those who returned to Friuli Venezia Giulia were children, grandchildren and great-grandchildren of Italians emigrated to Argentina in the first and second post-war.

Brazil
The first news concerning the possibility, for the inhabitants of the current region of Friuli Venezia Giulia, of reaching the lands of the interior of Brazil as emigrants dates back to 1872. The farmers of the Italian Friuli were mostly involved in flows to Brazil.

In Casso, at the westernmost point of Friuli, departures to the countryside of Brazil began in September 1877.
The remarkable increase in emigration within Friuli and Veneto in the second half of the 1880s derives from the worsening of the agrarian crisis, when inflows of agricultural products from abroad led to the fall in cereal prices. The worsening in the living conditions of the farmers was general. In the case of Caneva, for example, the departures to Brazil registered a remarkable growth during 1887.

The territories of the current states of Rio Grande do Sul, Santa Catarina, Paraná, Mato Grosso do Sul, Mato Grosso, Minas Gerais, Espírito Santo, Maranhão and Pará were the ones that received Friulian immigrants.

Based on estimates for Italian immigrants in general until 1915, around 84% of those who arrived in the country from Friuli and Venezia Giulia until then would have remained in Brazil.

Australia
Migration from Italy to Australia was characterized by a barely discernable start, at the end of the 19th century. During the 1880s there were a certain number of people from Friuli, who had arrived in Sydney in April 1881 in a group of about two hundreds (from both Veneto and Friuli), after an adventurous journey around the pacific isles.

There was an unremarkable flow in the next few decades which suddenly changed, however, after the Second World War. Here it became a fully-fledged emigration phenomenon, albeit not a mass one. Immigrants came from Istria, Fiume, Dalmatia, Friuli, and Trieste.
From the 1960s, however, they started coming back to Italy.

As for the region of Friuli, the factors attracting people back to their country were many, often combining with each other: the global recession of the beginning of the 1970s; the industrial and tourism development by areas that had once seen a critical exodus; the will to be a part of the reconstruction of the affected area by the earthquake in Friuli in 1976; the judicious laws of the regional administration aimed at encouraging returns.

Belgium
Right after the end of the First World War the migratory masses started to flow from Italy to Belgium. This was caused by the fact that after the War the country of Belgium needed workers to begin reconstructing the Country, and started a new call for recruiting workers. 

Italians were the ones who firstly responded to the call, and about 23,000 people were involved. These people had chosen to go individually, but some years later, departures were organized by Italian and Belgium authorities which wanted to help the migrants and help the Belgian Country. They started a recruitement process which was managed by the Belgian employers offices, who transmitted the immigration forms to the Italian authorities. This process was dealt with by the offices in Milan and Brussels. 
 
In 1908 a new office was created in Udine, that operated as an employment agency for overseas jobs. 
The Italian offices were responsible for sending their workforce to these countries. In Udine, the Provincial Employment Office, in 1922, had 8,306 reservations, and that year alone the Office sent 4,843 workers abroad. Compared to the year before, the office managed the application of 3,411 more workers. 
To speed things up, the emigration office published in 1992 the “Special guidelines for those leaving for Belgium”. This pamphlet speaks volumes about the importance given to the Belgian emigration for the Friulan population.

The Friulan language
The Friulan language is detached from other Rhaeto-Romance languages because of the influence exerted by Latin. It is considered one of the most complete languages within the Rhaeto-Romance family, thanks to its vast vocabulary. Nevertheless, studies about the Rhaeto-Romance languages show phonetic commonalities with French, which suggest unique roots. Interestingly, the same studies hold that the different dialects spoken in Friuli are not more related to each other than they are to French.

See also
 Demographics of Italy
 Asteroid 212705 Friûl was named in honor of the Friuli region

References

 

Linguistic minorities
Friuli
Ethnic groups in Italy

Romance peoples